was a Japanese automotive parts company. The company had production facilities on four continents, with its European headquarters located in Germany. In 2013, a series of deaths and injuries associated with defective Takata airbag inflators made in their Mexico plant, led Takata to initially recall 3.6 million cars equipped with such airbags. Further fatalities caused by the airbags have led the National Highway Traffic Safety Administration (NHTSA) to order an ongoing, US-wide recall of more than 42 million cars, the largest automotive recall in U.S. history. In June 2017, Takata filed for bankruptcy. It was acquired by Key Safety Systems.

History 
Takata was founded in 1933 in Shiga Prefecture, Japan, by Takezo Takada and started to produce lifelines for parachutes, and other textiles. In the early 1950s, the company started to research seat belts. Later they incorporated as "Takata". In the 1960s, Takata started to sell seat-belts and built Japan's first crash test plant for testing seat-belts under real world conditions.

In the 1970s, Takata developed child restraint systems. In the 1980s the company changed its name to "Takata Corporation" and expanded internationally to Korea, the United States, and later to England, to sell seat-belts.

In 2000, Takata Corporation acquired German competitor Petri AG, forming the European subsidiary Takata-Petri, renamed Takata AG in early 2012. Takata AG makes steering wheels and  plastic parts, not only for the automotive industry.

On June 25, 2017, Takata filed for Chapter 11 bankruptcy in the United States and filed for bankruptcy protection in Japan, owing more in compensation than was possible for its survival.  The surviving assets were sold to its largest competitor, Chinese owned and U.S. (Michigan) based Key Safety Systems, for about $1.6 billion. On April 11, 2018, following the completion of Key Safety System's acquisition of Takata, the company announced that the company would be renamed to Joyson Safety Systems, and continue to operate in Michigan as Key Safety Systems.

Recalls

1995 recall 
In May 1995, a recall in the U.S. affecting 8,428,402 predominantly Japanese built vehicles made from 1986 to 1991 with seat belts manufactured by the Takata Corporation of Japan, was begun. It was called at the time the "second largest recall in the 30-year history of the Department of Transportation (DOT)". The recall was prompted by an investigation (PE94-052) carried out by the National Highway Traffic Safety Administration (NHTSA) on Takata-equipped Honda vehicles, after many of their owners complained of seat belt buckles either failing to latch, latching and releasing automatically, or releasing in accidents. It revealed that potentially faulty Takata seat belts were not limited only to Honda vehicles, but to other Japanese imports as well.

NHTSA opened up a second investigation on Takata seatbelts broadly  (EA94-036) as well as individual investigations on the vehicle manufacturers using Takata seat belts to determine the magnitude of the defect. This second investigation was only limited to the front seat belt buckles and in particular Takata's 52X and A7X models. This determined that a total of 11 manufacturers were affected by the investigation.

Japanese models sold in the United States by American Honda Motor Co., Isuzu Motors of America Inc., Mazda Motor of America Inc., Nissan North America, Daihatsu Motor Co. American, Mitsubishi Motor Sales of America Inc. and Subaru of America Inc. also had affected seat belt buckles.

Moreover, Chrysler, General Motors and Ford all had various models manufactured by Japanese companies with the seat belt buckles concerned, but sold under American names such as the Dodge Stealth and the Geo series (except Prizm) under General Motors.

Ford had vehicles such as the Probe manufactured by Mazda on its MX-6 platform and the Festiva made by Kia in South Korea, but engineered by Mazda that also had the seat belts. However, unlike Chrysler and General Motors, Ford did not admit that their seat belts could be defective.

Initially, some Japanese manufacturers suspected that the seat belt failures were a result of user abuse, rather than a design failure; however, the nine-month investigation by NHTSA concluded that the cause of the defect was that the buckles were made of ABS plastic. Through exposure to ultraviolet light over a period of time, the plastic became brittle and pieces fell off, causing a jamming of the release button mechanism.

The manufacturers involved agreed to a voluntary recall, though this did not go smoothly. Only 18% of the 8.9 million cars and trucks with the Takata belt buckle were repaired two years after the recall had begun. In addition, NHTSA assessed a $50,000 civil penalty against both Honda and Takata for failing to notify the agency about the seat belt defect in a timely manner. Honda was fined because NHTSA believed the company knew about the hazard at least five years before the recall, but never reported the problem to NHTSA, nor offered to conduct a voluntary recall.

Defective airbag recalls (2013–present)
Takata began making airbags in 1988 and, as of 2014, held 20 percent of the market. During 2013, several automakers began large recalls of vehicles due to Takata-made airbags. Reports state that the problems may have begun a decade before, with the faulty airbags placed in some Honda models starting in 1998.

Honda stated they knew of more than 100 injuries and thirteen deaths (seven in the United States plus six in Malaysia) that were related to Takata airbags.

In April and May 2013, a total of 3.6 million cars were recalled due to defective Takata airbags. All of those airbags were made at, or otherwise used inflator units manufactured by, Takata's Monclova Plant in Coahuila, Mexico, operated by Takata's North American/Mexican subsidiary, TK Holdings Inc. In November 2014, BMW announced they would move any orders from the Mexican plant to a Takata plant in Germany.

In June 2014, Takata admitted their Mexican subsidiary had mishandled the manufacture of explosive propellants and improperly stored chemicals used in airbags. Identifying vehicles with defective airbags was made more difficult by the failure of TK Holdings Inc. to keep proper quality control records. That prompted another round of recalls in June 2014.

In their statement the company said, "We take this situation seriously, will strengthen our quality control and make a concerted effort to prevent a recurrence".

On June 23, 2014, auto manufacturers BMW, Chrysler, Ford, Honda, Mazda, Nissan, and Toyota announced they were recalling over three million vehicles worldwide due to Takata Corporation-made airbags. The reason was that they could rupture and send debris flying inside the vehicle. This was in response to a US National Highway Traffic Safety Administration (NHTSA) investigation that was initiated after the NHTSA received three injury complaints.

In a statement on June 23, 2014, Takata said they thought excessive moisture was the cause of the defect. Haruo Otani, an official at the vehicle recall section of the Japanese Ministry of Land, Infrastructure, Transport and Tourism, said that moisture and humidity could be seeping inside inflators, destabilizing the volatile propellant inside.

In July 2014, a pregnant Malaysian woman was killed in a collision involving her 2003 Honda City which contained the defective airbag. The woman, aged 42, died when a metal fragment from a ruptured driver's airbag sliced into her neck in the accident in which she was driving at around 30 km/h (18 mph) when another vehicle hit her at a junction, according to a lawsuit filed by her father at a Miami federal court. Her daughter, delivered after the mother's death, died three days later.

On November 18, 2014, the NHTSA ordered Takata to initiate a nationwide airbag recall. The action came as 10 automakers in the U.S. recalled hundreds of thousands of cars equipped with potentially faulty air bags manufactured by Takata.

As of May 19, 2015, Takata is now responsible for the largest auto recall in history.  Takata has already recalled 40 million vehicles across 12 vehicle brands for "Airbags that could explode and potentially send shrapnel into the face and body of both the driver and front seat passenger".  This recall will bring the number up to about 53 million automobiles eligible for this recall. In November 2015, Takata was fined $200 million ($70 million paid upfront) by U.S. federal regulators in response to Takata's admission of a fault. Toyota, Mazda and Honda have said that they will not use ammonium nitrate-based inflators.

On May 4, 2016, the NHTSA announced recall campaigns of an additional estimated 35-40 million inflators, adding to the already 28.8 million inflators previously recalled.

On January 13, 2017, the United States charged three Takata executives, Shinichi Tanaka, Hideo Nakajima and Tsuneo Chikaraishi for Takata's exploding airbags. The company agreed to plead guilty and to pay $1 billion to resolve the investigation, which includes a $25 million fine, $125 million for victim compensation and $850 million to compensate automobile manufacturers. At least 16 deaths are linked to the defective airbags.

On 28 February 2018 the Australian Federal Government announced the compulsory recall of all cars fitted with Takata airbags. "About 2.3 million vehicles will be subject to the compulsory recall and the airbags must be replaced within two years."

On 1 March 2018, it was announced that 106,806 Volkswagen vehicles, including models such as the Golf, Passat, Polo, CC Eos, and 'Up!', have been recalled for containing defective Takata airbags.

On 2 March 2018, Holden announced that the airbag recall now includes 330,000 of their Australian vehicles, despite not originally having any of their cars in the federal government's compulsory recall list.

On 4 April 2018, the New Zealand government, having decided "they present the highest safety risk to drivers and passengers," announced a compulsory recall of 50,000 vehicles fitted with Alpha-type Takata airbags. This compulsory recall is said to be only the second in New Zealand's history and the largest vehicle recall of its kind. The Ministry of Commerce and Consumer Affairs stated that it will also block the importation of any vehicles whose faulty airbags have not been replaced.

On 28 June 2018, Transport Canada announced the recall of 222,336 Honda vehicles manufactured between 2001 and 2007 that previously had their front passenger airbags modified under the original Takata airbag recall of 23 June 2014. The modifications done to the original airbags feature a non-desiccated inflator, which could rupture upon deployment, causing metal inflator fragments to pass through the cushion material, causing injury or death. Honda did not replace the airbag in the original recall. Honda is replacing these airbags with units that feature a desiccated inflator.

On 4 December 2019, Takata recalled another 1.4 million front driver inflators in the U.S., according to government documents.

On 17 December 2019, The Australian Competition and Consumer Commission (ACCC) issued a new warning affecting around 78,000 cars manufactured between 1996 and 2000 of the following makes; Audi, BMW, Ford, Honda, Mazda, Mitsubishi, Suzuki and Toyota.

Cars affected 
As of 2017, car manufacturers affected by this recall include Acura, Audi, BMW, Cadillac, Chevrolet, Chrysler, Daimler Trucks North America, Daimler Vans USA LLC, Dodge/Ram, Ferrari, Ford, GMC, Honda, Infiniti, Jaguar, Jeep, Land Rover, Lexus, Lincoln, Mazda, McLaren, Mercedes-Benz, Mercury, Mitsubishi, Nissan, Pontiac, Saab, Saturn, Scion, Subaru, and Toyota.

In 2014, BMW, Chrysler, Ford, Honda, Mazda, Nissan, and Toyota notified the NHTSA that they were conducting limited regional recalls to address a possible safety defect involving Takata brand air bag inflators.

In May 2014, General Motors expanded their earlier recall of their 2012 Chevrolet Cruze sedan and other models because of an electrical problem with the Takata airbags. The recall also included the Buick Verano, the Chevrolet Sonic and the Chevrolet Camaro.

On June 25, 2014, General Motors told their North American dealers to stop selling their 2013 and 2014 model Chevrolet Cruze sedans. GM stated, "Certain vehicles may be equipped with a suspect driver's air bag inflator module that may have been assembled with an incorrect part." The airbags involved were made by Takata Corporation. On June 11, 2014, Toyota recalled 2.3 million vehicles, many for the second time.

On July 17, 2015, Ferrari issued a recall for their lineup from the 2014-15 model years due to the driver's side airbags being improperly installed and the leather covering them improperly glued. This was discovered when the company was conducting tests on a 458 Italia and the airbags would deploy at a rotated orientation, potentially causing injuries.

Ford added certain models to the list after the 10th death occurred when the airbag in a 2006 Ford Ranger pickup driven by a Georgia man ruptured violently in South Carolina, in late December 2015.

On January 4, 2019, Ford issued a recall for an additional 953,000 vehicles, including 782,384 in the United States and federalized territories and 149,652 in Canada. Affected vehicles included 2010 Ford Edge and Lincoln MKX, the 2010 and 2011 Ford Ranger, the 2010 to 2012 Ford Fusion and Lincoln MKZ, the 2010 and 2011 Mercury Milan, and the 2010 to 2014 Ford Mustang. This was a planned expansion of previously recalled vehicles as identified earlier by the NHTSA.

Takata claimed that the issue has only been shown to affect vehicles in hot and humid locations. However, all potentially affected vehicles have been recalled as a precaution. No evidence of the issue has been seen in the UK or  Europe.

Nearly all reported injuries (both fatal and minor) had been recorded in Honda vehicles, something which is undergoing investigation.

In June 2021, Joyson announced that they had discovered over a thousand cases where Takata had falsified seat belt safety test data.

See also 

 List of companies of Japan
 Ammonium nitrate (used by Takata as airbag propellant from the late 1990s as a cheaper (but less stable) alternative to tetrazole)
 Sodium azide (old highly stable airbag propellant phased out by Takata in the 1990s in favor of the less potentially toxic tetrazole)
Guanidine nitrate, alternative airbag propellant used in Autoliv and TRW airbags, less sensitive to moisture.

Note

References

External links 
 Official website (archived, 11 March 2017)
 List of vehicles affected in the airbag recall in the US (Department of Transportation) 
 takata.com Takata Corporation homepage 
 Bernstein, Joanna Zuckerman; Klayman, Ben (20 November 2014). "Special Report: Plant with troubled past at center of Takata air bag probe". Reuters. Retrieved 25 May 2015.
 Lienert, Paul; Dye, Jessica (24 March 2016).  "Exclusive: Honda and Takata's stealth airbag fix" Reuters

Automotive companies based in Tokyo
Auto parts suppliers of Japan
Chemical companies based in Tokyo
Manufacturing companies based in Tokyo
Textile companies of Japan
Companies listed on the Tokyo Stock Exchange
Companies that have filed for bankruptcy in Japan
Japanese brands
Automotive companies established in 1933
Japanese companies established in 1933
Defunct defense companies of Japan
Product safety scandals
Vehicle safety technologies
Multinational companies headquartered in Japan
Companies that filed for Chapter 11 bankruptcy in 2017
2017 mergers and acquisitions
Airbags
Vehicle recalls
Manufacturing companies disestablished in 2018
Japanese companies disestablished in 2018
Ammonium nitrate disasters
Corporate scandals